Llandudno General Hospital is a general hospital in Llandudno, Wales. It is managed by the Betsi Cadwaladr University Health Board.

History
The hospital has its origins in the Llandudno Fever hospital which was built in the 1890s. The foundation stone for a new hospital to be built to the south of the fever hospital, was laid on 15 June 1938 and it was officially opened by Princess Alice, Countess of Athlone accompanied by the Earl of Athlone on 12 August 1939. A new osteoporosis and bone densitometry unit was opened by Dr Brian Gibbons, Health Minister in the Welsh Assembly Government, in December 2006.

References

NHS hospitals in Wales
Hospitals in Conwy County Borough
Hospitals established in 1939
Hospital buildings completed in 1939
Betsi Cadwaladr University Health Board
1939 establishments in Wales